Ulupınar (literally "great springs" in Turkish) may refer to the following places in Turkey:

 Ulupınar, Ayaş, a village in the district of Ayaş, Ankara Province
 Ulupınar, Bilecik, a village in the district of Bilecik, Bilecik Province
 Ulupınar, Burdur
 Ulupınar, Çanakkale
 Ulupınar, Gülnar, village in the district of Gülnar, Mersin Province
 Ulupınar, Kahta, a village in the district of Kahta, Adıyaman Province
 Ulupınar, Keban
 Ulupınar, Kemer, a village in the district of Kemer, Antalya Province